"It's a Beautiful Thing" is the third and final single released by Australian actress Tammin from her first album, Whatever Will Be (2005). Andrew and Michael Tierney from Australian pop group Human Nature helped produce the song's vocals. Released on 25 July 2005, "It's a Beautiful Thing" entered the Australian ARIA Singles Chart at number 30 and spent 12 weeks in the top 100. The CD single contains three acoustic versions of album tracks plus the video clip for her second single, "Whatever Will Be".

Track listing
Australian CD single
 "It's a Beautiful Thing" (Fresh radio mix) – 3:17
 "Pointless Relationship" (acoustic) – 4:03
 "Tender" (acoustic) – 3:56
 "Whatever Will Be" (acoustic) – 3:33
 "Whatever Will Be" (video) – 3:50

Credits and personnel
Credits are lifted from the Whatever Will Be liner notes.

Studio
 Mastered at Studio 301 (Sydney, Australia)

Personnel

 Matthew Gerrard – writing, production, arrangement
 Bridget Benenate – writing
 Steve Booker – writing
 Andrew Tierney – additional vocal production
 Michael Tierney – additional vocal production
 Mark Endert – mixing
 Don Bartley – mastering

Charts

References

Tammin Sursok songs
2005 singles
2005 songs
Columbia Records singles
Songs written by Bridget Benenate
Songs written by Matthew Gerrard
Songs written by Steve Booker (producer)
Song recordings produced by Matthew Gerrard
Sony BMG singles